Luis Belló Martínez also known as Belló II (7 January 1929 – 3 October 2021) was a Spanish football player and manager.

Playing career
From 1949 to 1958, Belló played top-flight professional football, mostly with the Spanish teams Real Zaragoza and Hércules CF. From 1961 to 1965, he was the sports director of Zaragoza. In 1964, when he was the coach after the sacking of Ramallets, Belló won the domestic Cup and the Inter-Cities Fairs Cup. The 1968–69 season, as coach of Pontevedra CF, was his only season coaching a team in the top division.

References

External links
 

1929 births
2021 deaths
People from Cieza, Murcia
Spanish footballers
Footballers from the Region of Murcia
Association football midfielders
La Liga players
Segunda División players
Albacete Balompié players
Real Zaragoza players
Hércules CF players
Spanish football managers
La Liga managers
Real Zaragoza managers
Hércules CF managers
Real Betis managers
CD Castellón managers
Pontevedra CF managers
Real Murcia managers
FC Cartagena managers
CD Cieza players